Henry Tudor may refer to:

 Henry VII of England (1457–1509), born Henry Tudor
 Henry VIII of England (1491–1547), son of Henry VII
 Henry, Duke of Cornwall (1511), son of Henry VIII
 Henry FitzRoy, 1st Duke of Richmond and Somerset (1519–1536), son of Henry VIII and mistress Elizabeth Blount
 Henri Tudor (1859–1928), Luxembourgish engineer
 Henry Hugh Tudor (1871–1965), British Army Major General